Amphilius dimonikensis is a species of catfish in the genus Amphilius. It is endemic to the Mpoulou River in Mayombe, Republic of the Congo. Its length reaches 5.6 cm.

References 

dimonikensis
Freshwater fish of Africa
Fish described in 2007